Michael Hubert Corbey (born 1963) is a Dutch business economist, management consultant, and Professor of Accounting and Control at the TIAS School for Business and Society at the Tilburg University.

Biography 
Corbey grew up in Roermond and received his MA in Technology Management at the Eindhoven University of Technology, and in 1995 his PhD with a thesis entitled "Logistiek management & management accounting : logistieke flexibiliteit in bedrijfseconomisch perspectief" (logistic management & management accounting: logistic flexibility in business economical perspective) under supervision of Jacques Theeuwes.

Corbey started his career working in industry and consultancy. In 1993 he returned to the academic world and became Associate Professor at the Faculty of Economics of the Tilburg University. In 1997-98 he was Visiting faculty at the INSEAD Business School in Fontainebleau. In 1999 he was appointed Professor Management Accounting and Control at the Maastricht University and Director of the Register Controller program. In 2002 he was appointed Professor of Management Accounting and Control at the TIAS School for Business and Society at the Tilburg University.
 
Corbey is member of the editorial board of the Maandblad voor Accountancy en Bedrijfseconomie and Tijdschrift voor Organisaties in Control and others. In 2006 and 2007 Corbey was awarded the TiasNimbas Best Teacher Award.

Publications 
Books, a selection:
 1995. Logistiek management & management accounting : logistieke flexibiliteit in bedrijfseconomisch perspectief
 1999. Bedrijfseconomie Deel I: Grondslagen en Perspectieven. With W.G.H. van Hulst.

Articles, a selection:
 Corbey, M. H. "Meetbare economische gevolgen van investeringen in flexibele capaciteit." Bedrijfskunde 61.3 (1989): 234.
 Corbey, M. H., and P. G. Tullemans. "Economische beslissingsondersteuning bij volumeflexibiliteit." Bedrijfskunde 63.3 (1991): 289.

References

External links 
 CURRICULUM VITAE Prof. dr. ir. Michael Corbey

1963 births
Living people
Dutch business theorists
Dutch economists
Accounting academics
Eindhoven University of Technology alumni
Academic staff of Tilburg University
Academic staff of Maastricht University
People from Roermond